Wallace Jansen de Souza Martins (born ) is a Brazilian male volleyball player. With his club SESI-SP he competed at the 2011 FIVB Volleyball Men's Club World Championship.

References

External links
 Wallace Martins at the International Volleyball Federation
 
 Wallace Jansen De Souza Martins at WorldofVolley

1983 births
Living people
Brazilian men's volleyball players
Place of birth missing (living people)
Volleyball players at the 2011 Pan American Games
Pan American Games gold medalists for Brazil
Pan American Games medalists in volleyball
Sporting CP volleyball players
Medalists at the 2011 Pan American Games